Ivan Pavle (born March 8, 1955, Galanta)  is a Slovakian painter.

Life
Pavle was born on March 8, 1955, in Galanta, Slovakia, to Matej Pavle and Alžbeta Pavleová. He grew up in Prievidza with two brothers, Matej and Slavomír. He completed primary school in Prievidza in 1970. Pavle then studied engineering in high school in Tvrdošín and fine art at the Academy of Fine Arts in Bratislava under professors Dezider Castiglione and Ivan Vychlopen, graduating in 1981. He married a Fine Arts classmate, Soňa Oravcová, and they have two children. Since arts school, Pavle has pursued an artistic career focused on painting, drawing, graphics,  and sculpture.

Style and methods 
Pavle systematically refers to several thematic fields. Figurative painting, nudes, torso and faces covered by masks characterise Pavle’s paintings and drawings. The representation of human body is further reinforced by emphasising the gestures, body shapes in motion and relationship studies of two and more characters.  A long term cycle Madon is not only an attempt to cope with one of the basic themes of the large painting of the past, but also highlights the artist‘s intimate intention to explore the world around him. Another major and repeatedly depicted theme in Pavle’s work concerns mythology, which is implemented in a never ending cycle of paintings about Babylon, as well as in other art pieces – fictitious landscapes and mysterious characters with animal features.
His work is noted for its intensity and distinctive style. Furthermore, Pavle cherishes the legacy of the finest artworks of the past; therefore he applies old and often obsolete techniques in a combination with his own specific artistic processes. His extensive work combines knowledge of tradition and respect for the material while also focusing on contemporary content.

Exhibitions and awards
Pavle‘s works have been exhibited in prestigious Slovak and foreign galleries in Poland, Germany, Netherlands, Austria, France, Monaco, Italy, Thailand and the USA. In order to broaden his artistic perception the artist attended numerous creative workshops, mainly in the US and France, where he was awarded with the Jury Prize at the International Festival of Painting in Cagnes sur Mer in 1989. His monumental and intimate works are represented in many galleries and private collections around the world.
 1985 Turčianske múzeum A. Kmeťa (with Ján Hlavatý), Martin (Slovakia)
 1986 Finkova kúria, Zvolen, (Slovakia)
 1987
 Československé kultúrne stredisko (with Oto Bachorík), Katowice,
 Chelm, Varšava (Poland)
 Výstavná sieň mladých (with Stano Stankoci), Bratislava (Slovakia)
 1988
 Galéria L. Novomeského (with Oto Bachorík and Stanislav Stankoci), Bratislava (Slovakia)
 Galéria F. Studeného (with Oto Bachorík), Nitra (Slovakia)
 1989  Galéria C. Majerníka, Bratislava (Slovakia)
 1990  Galéria mesta Bratislavy, Bratislava (Slovakia)
 1991
 Galéria Štúdia S (with Soňa Pavleová), Bratislava  (Slovakia)
 Galerie Atelierhof, Brémy (Germany)
 Nassauische Sparkasse (with Alex Kraščenič) Montabaur (Germany)
 Galerie de Gang, Delft (Netherlands)
 Gallery Art Fonctionel, Metz (France)
 Siemens Nixdorf (with Stano Černý, Alex Kračšenič and Róbert Jančovič)
 Kolín nad Rýnom (Germany)
 1992
 Dom slovenskej kultúry (with Oto Bachorík), Praha (Czech)
 Galéria NOVA, Bratislava (Slovakia)
 Europahaus, Graz (Austria)
 Galéria M. A. Bazovského (with Jozef Hobor), Trenčín (Slovakia)
 1993
 Galerie Mitte (with Stanislavom Stankocim), Vienna (Austria)
 Terre ou Art, Verdun (France)
 Studio Bauform, Kolín nad Rýnom (Germany)
 Veľvyslanectvo Slovenskej republiky, Bonn (Germany)
 1994
 Žltý dom Vincenta van Gogha (with Oto Bachorík), Poprad (Slovakia)
 Art Gallery Heeze, Eidhoven (Netherlands)
 De Brouwerij, Weelde (Netherlands)
 1995
 Galéria mesta Bratislavy, Bratislava (Slovakia)
 Galéria NOVA, Bratislava (Slovakia)
 Kunst RAI’95, Amsterdam (Netherlands)
 1996 Rezidencia Slovenskej republiky, New York (US)
 1997 Gallery MOCA (Museum of Contemporary Art), Washington (US)
 1999 Galéria NOVA, Bratislava (Slovakia)
 2001 Gallery Missing Link, Sarasota, Florida (US)
 2004
 Cité internationale des arts in Paris
 Galéria NOVA, Bratislava (Slovakia)
 2005 Danubiana, Meulensteen Art Museum, Bratislava (Slovakia)
 2008 Slovenská ambasáda, (with Oto Bachorík), Roma (Italy)
 2009 Herzliya, (with V. Petrík, M. Kellenberger, P. Pollág, J. Oravec, Š.Polák) (Izrael)
 2011
 15 umelcov v Galérii SPP, Bratislava (Slovakia)
 Slovak art for Slovak culture evening in Monaco
 2012
 Spectrum Art v Galérii SPP, Bratislava (Slovakia)
 Private studio exhibition, Tribecca - New York (USA)
 2013 Galéria Jána Koniarika v Trnave (Slovakia)
 2014 Umenie lieči (33. Renomovaných umělců), NOÚ Bratislava (Slovakia)
 2015 Crystal Wing Awards, Visual Arts

Virtual tours
Pavle decided to make virtual tours of his exhibitions – to make them immortal. Here are links for two of them.

2015 Slovenské národné múzeum, Bratislava

2015 Jonáš a veľryba, Danubiana, Meulensteen Art Museum, Bratislava

Book about author
Daniel Hevier – Ivan Pavle: Vydavateľstvo: Galéria NOVA, 2005

References

1955 births
Slovak painters
Living people